We Got the Power may mean:
"We Got the Power" (Gorillaz song), 2017
"We Got the Power" (Loreen song), 2013
"We Got the Power", a 2005 song by Dropkick Murphys from Singles Collection, Volume 2